Sabar Karyaman Gutama (born 8 January 1996) is an Indonesian badminton player affiliated with Exist Jakarta club. He was part of the National team that won the bronze medal at the 2019 Asia Mixed Team Championships.

Career 
Gutama is a member of Exist Jakarta club. In February 2015, he was selected to join a training camp in South Korea, a cooperation program between Badminton Association of Indonesia and Badminton Korea Association. Gutama entered the Indonesian National training center in 2017.

In 2021, Gutama played with Muhammad Reza Pahlevi Isfahani, reaching to the semi finals in the Orléans Masters and the finals in the Spain Masters.

In 2022, Gutama and Pahlevi reached the semi finals in the Singapore Open and Vietnam Open.

2023 
Gutama and his partner, Pahlevi, started the BWF tour in the home tournament, Indonesia Masters, but lost in the second round from Chinese pair He Jiting and Zhou Haodong. In the next tournament, they lost in the first round of the Thailand Masters from unfamous Malaysian pair Low Hang Yee and Ng Eng Cheong in straight sets.

Achievements

BWF World Tour (1 runner-up) 
The BWF World Tour, which was announced on 19 March 2017 and implemented in 2018, is a series of elite badminton tournaments sanctioned by the Badminton World Federation (BWF). The BWF World Tour is divided into levels of World Tour Finals, Super 1000, Super 750, Super 500, Super 300, and the BWF Tour Super 100.

Men's doubles

BWF International Challenge/Series (2 titles) 
Men's doubles

  BWF International Challenge tournament
  BWF International Series tournament

BWF Junior International (1 title, 1 runner-up) 
Boys' doubles

  BWF Junior International Grand Prix tournament
  BWF Junior International Challenge tournament
  BWF Junior International Series tournament
  BWF Junior Future Series tournament

Performance timeline 
Performance timeline

National team 
 Senior level

Individual competitions 
 Senior level

References

External links 
 

1996 births
Living people
People from Sumedang
Sportspeople from West Java
Indonesian male badminton players